Robert Charles Soth (born April 6, 1933) is an American long-distance runner. He competed in the men's 5000 metres at the 1960 Summer Olympics.

References

External links
 

1933 births
Living people
Athletes (track and field) at the 1960 Summer Olympics
American male long-distance runners
Olympic track and field athletes of the United States
People from Tama, Iowa
Track and field athletes from Iowa
Pan American Games medalists in athletics (track and field)
Pan American Games bronze medalists for the United States
Athletes (track and field) at the 1959 Pan American Games
Medalists at the 1959 Pan American Games
20th-century American people